The commune of Ruyigi is a commune of Ruyigi Province in eastern Burundi. The capital lies at Ruyigi.

References

Communes of Burundi
Ruyigi Province